Doreen Ashburnham-Ruffner, GC (13 May 1905 – 4 October 1991) was the youngest British female recipient of the Albert Medal which later became the George Cross.

Doreen Ashburnham was the granddaughter of Sir Anchitel Ashburnham, the eighth baronet of Broomham, Sussex. In adulthood she moved to California and became a member of the first women's polo team. She later moved to Italy to breed horses, and took the name Ruffner after she married and became a US Citizen in 1942.

Albert Medal
On 23 September 1916, Ashburnham was walking with her eight-year old friend Anthony Farrer on Vancouver Island when they were attacked by a 180lb mountain lion. She said of the attack "The cougar sprang from about 35ft and landed on my back, throwing me forward on to my face. He chewed on my shoulder and bit chunks off my butt.

"Tony attacked him with a bridle that he was carrying. They fought for 200 yards down the trail. The cougar scratched the skin off Tony's back and ripped the flesh off his scalp. His scalp was hanging off the back of his head by six hairs."

As the Albert Medal was replaced by the George Cross in 1971, Ashburnham's post-nominal letters changed from AM to GC at that time.

References

External links
 

1905 births
1991 deaths
People from Rye, East Sussex
Recipients of the Albert Medal (lifesaving)
Naturalized citizens of the United States
British recipients of the George Cross
Big cat attack victims